The 2001–02 Idaho Vandals men's basketball team represented the University of Idaho during the 2001–02 NCAA Division I men's basketball season. Members of the Big West Conference, the Vandals were led by first-year head coach Leonard Perry and played their home games on campus at Cowan Spectrum in Moscow, Idaho.

Postseason result

|-
!colspan=6 style=| Big West tournament

References

External links
Sports Reference – Idaho Vandals: 2001–02 basketball season
Gem of the Mountains: 2002 University of Idaho yearbook – 2001–02 basketball season
Idaho Argonaut – student newspaper – 2002 editions

Idaho Vandals men's basketball seasons
Idaho
Idaho Vandals men's basketball team
Idaho Vandals men's basketball team